Thomas Arthur Robertson (2 November 1876 – 24 July 1942) was an Australian rules footballer who played with St Kilda in the Victorian Football League (VFL).

References

External links 

1876 births
1942 deaths
Australian rules footballers from Melbourne
St Kilda Football Club players
Brunswick Football Club players
People from North Melbourne